The Communauté de communes Ponthieu-Marquenterre is a communauté de communes in the Somme département and in the Hauts-de-France région of France. It was formed on 1 January 2017 by the merger of the former Communauté de communes Authie-Maye, the Communauté de communes du Canton de Nouvion and the Communauté de communes du Haut Clocher. It consists of 71 communes, and its seat is in Rue. Its area is 783.7 km2, and its population was 32,952 in 2019.

Composition
The communauté de communes consists of the following 71 communes:

Agenvillers
Ailly-le-Haut-Clocher
Argoules
Arry
Bernay-en-Ponthieu
Le Boisle
Boufflers
Brailly-Cornehotte
Brucamps
Buigny-l'Abbé
Buigny-Saint-Maclou
Bussus-Bussuel
Canchy
Cocquerel
Coulonvillers
Cramont
Crécy-en-Ponthieu
Le Crotoy
Dominois
Dompierre-sur-Authie
Domqueur
Domvast
Ergnies
Estrées-lès-Crécy
Favières
Fontaine-sur-Maye
Forest-l'Abbaye
Forest-Montiers
Fort-Mahon-Plage
Francières
Froyelles
Gapennes
Gorenflos
Gueschart
Hautvillers-Ouville
Lamotte-Buleux
Ligescourt
Long
Machiel
Machy
Maison-Ponthieu
Maison-Roland
Mesnil-Domqueur
Millencourt-en-Ponthieu
Mouflers
Nampont
Neuilly-le-Dien
Neuilly-l'Hôpital
Nouvion
Noyelles-en-Chaussée
Noyelles-sur-Mer
Oneux
Ponches-Estruval
Ponthoile
Pont-Remy
Port-le-Grand
Quend
Regnière-Écluse
Rue
Sailly-Flibeaucourt
Saint-Quentin-en-Tourmont
Saint-Riquier
Le Titre
Vercourt
Villers-sous-Ailly
Villers-sur-Authie
Vironchaux
Vron
Yaucourt-Bussus
Yvrench
Yvrencheux

References 

Ponthieu-Marquenterre
Ponthieu-Marquenterre